NASA has hosted many events for its social media enthusiasts called NASA Socials (formerly NASA Tweetups) beginning in 2009. These events are targeted at the social media followers of NASA through platforms such as Twitter, Facebook, Google Plus, Instagram, YouTube and more. They provide guests with VIP access to NASA facilities and speakers with the goal of leveraging participants' social networks to further the outreach requirements of NASA as laid out in the National Aeronautics and Space Act. NASA re-branded these events as "Socials" in March 2012 as it expanded participation to services beyond just Twitter.

As of 2015, all NASA field centers and NASA Headquarters have hosted NASA Tweetup/Social events. There were 5 NASA Tweetups in 2009, 10 in 2010, 16 in 2011, 21 in 2012, 22 in 2013, and 23 in 2014. In August 2011, over 2,000 participants had been part of official NASA Tweetups. By July 2014, that number had swelled to over 6,000 total participants in over 5 years of NASA Social programs.

Many NASA Social events are at least partially broadcast on NASA TV and UStream. NASA Socials are held at NASA centers, NASA Headquarters,  observatories, engine test sites, museums such as the Newseum and National Air and Space Museum, and during larger events such as SXSW and World Space Week. The length of socials range from a few hours to a couple days to much longer in the case of some events, such as the STS-133 launch tweetup.

History 

The first NASA Tweetup was held at the Jet Propulsion Laboratory in Pasadena, California, in January 2009. During this event, guests were given exclusive tours and access to JPL scientists and engineers.|

In an attempt to measure the impact of tweetups, NASA tracked 10,665 tweets originating from 150 participants in the August 2011 Juno Tweetup as well as the subsequent retweets and found 29.9 million potential impressions.

Speakers and participants
Speakers at NASA tweetup/social events have included NASA engineers, scientists, executives and well over 80 NASA astronauts. Notable speakers include NASA Administrator Charles Bolden, SpaceX President Gwynne Shotwell, Senator and astronaut John Glenn, Bill Nye, and final Space Shuttle crew members Sandy Magnus and Chris Ferguson.

While the majority of participants in NASA tweetups/socials have been space enthusiasts, there have also been many "celebrity" participants, including Neil deGrasse Tyson, LeVar Burton, Trey Ratcliff, Robert Scoble, Bill Prady, Kevin Clash, Miles O'Brien, Seth Green, will.i.am, and many others.

List of NASA Socials and Tweetups

Awards
 2009 Shorty Awards for science for updates on the Mars Phoenix Lander
 Space Foundation's 2012 Douglas S. Morrow Public Outreach Award
 2012 Shorty Awards for best social media manager to NASA's Stephanie Schierholz
 2012 and 2013 Shorty Awards for best government use of social media.
 Space Flight Awareness Award
 NASA Exceptional Service Medal
 NASA Group Achievement Award

Cultural references
In the 2015 film The Martian, Donald Glover's character Rich Purnell, a NASA Jet Propulsion Laboratory employee, wore a #NASASocial lanyard. This lanyard was frequently given out to NASA Social participants and NASA employees who supported the events. Per Veronica McGregor, NASA JPL News/Social Media Manager, "when the producers came to @NASAJPL for film research, [Stephanie L. Smith, NASA JPL Digital & Social Media Supervisor,] slipped the #NASASocial lanyards into their swag bags. :)"

External links
 Official site for NASA Socials
  
 
 
 9.88 gigapixel panoramic image of Juno Tweetup

References

NASA
Social media